Jaysingpur is a city and municipal council in the Kolhapur district of the Indian state of Maharashtra. The city derives its name from Raja Jaysing, the father of Shrimant Chhatrapati Shahu Maharaj of Kolhapur, who planned and developed the architecture of the city. Shahu Maharaj laid out Jaysingpur as one of the few "chess board cities" in Maharashtra where roads meet at 90-degree angles. Jaysingpur has emerged as a satellite of Sangli city and is growing at rapid pace. 

The city was founded in 1916 and celebrated its centenary(Shatabdi Varsha) in September 2016. Dr.Neeta Mane is Jaysingpur's current mayor.

The city also is known for its newly constructed Siddhivinayak Mandir. Its prime location on the Kolhapur-Shirol highway makes it more easy for the outsiders to visit the temple.

Jaysingpur also has a stadium, known as Dasra Chowk. Though not well-built, but it can hold local matches which are held every year in the month of April-May. Fairs, Festivals, Government Declarations are often held at this stadium.

Jaysingpur is rapidly developing as a major satellite suburb of the Sangli city. The city holds a strategic location between Sangli , Kolhapur , Miraj and Ichalkaranji.

Educational Institutions
Jaysingpur has many educational institutions. Schools in Jaysingpur are either "municipal schools" or private schools run by trusts or individuals, which may receive government financial aid. The schools are affiliated either with the Maharashtra State Board, The All-India Council for the Indian School Certificate Examinations, the National Institute of Open Schooling, or the Central Board of Secondary Education. Marathi, Semi-English and English are the usual languages of instruction. There are many schools which provide better education facilities at affordable fees. Laxminarayan Malu High School (Old Jaysingpur High School),  Balawantrao Zele High School, Jantara Kalpvruksha Vidyamandir (Old Bharat High School), the oldest schools hold more than 7000 students studying from First grade to Twelfth. Dr. J J Magdum Trust has given a great contribution in making this city an educational hub for the areas nearby. The trust includes 3 schools and one medical college, one diploma-polytechnic college and one engineering college. Postgraduate education in the fields of engineering and medicine is available.

Industries and Businesses
Jaysingpur is an important marketplace for the trading of tobacco and crops like rice baby corn and cereals. It is also an automotive industries supply chain hub as many suppliers transport their finished components through Jaysingpur. Baby corn suppliers from Danoli (Hirashankar Agro (Amit Dalavi). In addition, many high-tech engineering entrepreneurs have businesses in Jaysingpur.
A new movie making company has also established in jaysingpur.

Transport

Roads
Jaysingpur has good connectivity with a number of major cities. However, much of the road network remains unpaved. It is well connected with Kolhapur and Sangli with Kolhapur - Sangli State Highway.

Bus

Public transport by bus is provided by MSRTC (Maharashtra State Road Transport Corporation). There are also many private buses that provide services to all major destinations in Maharashtra, Karnataka and Andhra Pradesh. MSRTC provides bus services from Jaysingpur to Sangli city, Miraj city and the Kolhapur city every 15 minutes.

Railways
Jaysingpur has a railway station (station code JSP) which is on the Kolhapur–Miraj line of the Central Railway. Sangli railway station and Miraj Junction has daily connectivity to important cities and is a stop for long-distance trains like Karnataka Sampark Kranti Express, Goa Express, Chalukya Express, Poorna Express, Swarna Jayanti Express, Ajmer Bangalore Express, Jodhpur-Bangalore Express, Gandhidham Bangalore Express and Hubli Express.

References

Cities and towns in Kolhapur district